While Justice Sleeps is a legal thriller novel authored by American politician and writer Stacey Abrams, published on May 11, 2021.

Background
The book centers around a law clerk for an Associate Justice of the Supreme Court of the United States. After the Justice becomes gravely ill, the law clerk becomes his legal guardian. Abrams commented the inspiration for the book came from a conversation with her mother, in which her mother noted Article Three of the United States Constitution allows for a lifetime appointment for justices, but "has no failsafe for a person being physically unable to do the job."

Publication
The novel is the first one published with Abrams' name, as her previous novels have all been written under the pen name Selena Montgomery.

Immediately following its release, the book was the #1 on The New York Times Best Seller list for fiction novels.

Television adaptation
The novel is currently being produced as a television series by Working Title Films, a subsidiary of Universal Pictures.

References

2021 American novels
Legal thriller novels
Doubleday (publisher) books
Novels set in Washington, D.C.